Wang Hao (born December 26, 1992, in Tianjin) is a Chinese diver. She won the gold medal in women's 10m synchronized platform with Chen Ruolin at the 2011 World Aquatics Championships in Shanghai.

Major achievements
2006 National Diving Championships -  1st 10m Platform
2007 National Diving Championships -  1st 10m Platform
2008 FINA Diving Grand Prix (Madrid) -  1st 10m Platform & 10m Synchronized Platform
2009 National Games –  1st 10m Synchronized Platform
2009 East Asian Games –  1st 10m Platform & 10m Synchronized Platform
2010 FINA Diving World Series (Mexico Leg) -  1st 10m Synchronized Platform
2010 Asian Games –  1st 10m Synchronized Platform;  2nd 10m Platform
2011 FINA Diving World Series (Moscow Leg) -  1st 10m Synchronized Platform
2011 FINA Diving World Series (Beijing Leg) -  1st 10m Synchronized Platform
2011 FINA Diving World Series (Sheffield Leg) -  1st 10m Synchronized Platform
2011 FINA Diving World Series (Guanajuato Leg) -  1st 10m Synchronized Platform;  2nd 10m Platform
2011 World Aquatics Championships–  1st 10m Synchronized Platform

References

External links
Wang Hao's Sina Weibo

1992 births
Living people
Chinese female divers
Sportspeople from Tianjin
Divers at the 2012 Summer Olympics
Olympic divers of China
Olympic medalists in diving
Olympic gold medalists for China
Asian Games medalists in diving
Divers at the 2010 Asian Games
Medalists at the 2012 Summer Olympics
Asian Games gold medalists for China
Asian Games silver medalists for China
Medalists at the 2010 Asian Games
21st-century Chinese women